Montana Highway 80 (MT 80) is a  north–south state highway in the U.S. State of Montana. MT 80's southern terminus is at U.S. Route 87 (US 87), MT 3 and MT 200 in the community of Stanford and the northern terminus is at US 87 in the town of Fort Benton. The landscape is hilly and rural, and largely used for wheat farming; the road also passes through Arrow Creek Canyon and near the Highwood Mountains. Between Arrow Creek and Geraldine, MT 80 is roughly paralleled by the main line of Central Montana Rail.

History
Before receiving its current designation, Highway 80 was designated as Montana Secondary Highway 230.

Major intersections

References

External links

080
Transportation in Judith Basin County, Montana
Transportation in Fergus County, Montana
Transportation in Chouteau County, Montana